"Welcome to New York City" is the seventh track from Cam'ron's third album Come Home with Me. The song featured fellow Roc-a-Fella labelmate Jay-Z and Juelz Santana. The song was produced by Just Blaze (along with him providing additional vocals), who also produced other songs in this album such as "Losing Weight, Pt. 2" and the hit single Oh Boy. This song was also the theme song for the November 2005 popular crime video game  True Crime: New York City. The song peaked at #55 at the Hot R&B/Hip-Hop Singles & Tracks.

Track listing
A1 Welcome To New York City (Radio Edit)		
A2 Welcome To New York City (Album Version)		
B1 Welcome To New York City (Instrumental)		
B2 Welcome To New York City (A Cappella)

Charts

References

2002 songs
Cam'ron songs
Jay-Z songs
Juelz Santana songs
Song recordings produced by Just Blaze
Roc-A-Fella Records singles
Songs written by Cam'ron
Songs written by Jay-Z
Songs written by Juelz Santana
Songs about New York City
Hardcore hip hop songs